Wonderland Park is an amusement park located in Thompson Memorial Park, Amarillo, Texas, United States.

Park history 
The park was founded in 1951 by Paul and Alathea Roads. In 1969, several new rides were added that appealed to people of all ages, including a bumper car ride. The park is still run by the Roads family.

The COVID-19 pandemic shut down the 2020 season from mid-March to mid-June.

Attractions
 Amusement Park Rides
 Miniature Golf
 Arcade/Games
 The Food Booth
 Drink Booth
 Cotton Candy Booth

Roller coasters

Major rides

Water rides

Children’s rides

References

External links

 

Culture of Amarillo, Texas
Economy of Amarillo, Texas
Amusement parks in Texas
Tourist attractions in Amarillo, Texas
1951 establishments in Texas
Buildings and structures in Amarillo, Texas
Amusement parks opened in 1951